McNeill may refer to:

 McNeill (surname)
 McNeill, Mississippi, United States; an unincorporated community
 McNeill, West Virginia, United States; an unincorporated community
 Port McNeill, British Columbia, Canada; a town
 McNeill Bay (British Columbia), Canada
 McNeill HVDC Back-to-back station, Canada
 McNeill v. United States, 2011 United States Supreme Court case
 McNeill's law, describes the role of microbial disease in the conquering of people-groups
 McNeill's Rangers, independent Confederate military force
 Don McNeill's Breakfast Club, morning variety show on ABC radio

See also
McNeil (disambiguation)
MacNeil
MacNeill
McNeal
MacNeal
MacNeille